Shapeshifter is a six-song EP by American alternative rock/post-grunge music group Smile Empty Soul. The EP contains three of the biggest singles from their 2003 self-titled debut album re-recorded — "Bottom of a Bottle", "Silhouettes" and "Nowhere Kids" — as well as three new songs. It also includes a DVD which consists of a music video for "All in My Head", a short documentary-style film from the making of Shapeshifter, and a behind-the-scenes video covering years of touring, studio sessions, music video shoots, and more.

"All in My Head" was released as the first single from the EP on March 4, 2016, with a music video premiere on Revolver Magazine's website on March 15, 2016.

Track listing

Personnel 
 Sean Danielsen – vocals, guitar
 Ryan Martin – bass
 Jake Kilmer – drums

References

External links
 

2016 EPs
Smile Empty Soul albums
Albums produced by Eddie Wohl